Young Gi Han (born 1984), also known as Tina Han, is a South Korean artist. She attended Kyung Hee University for her BFA and the School of Visual Arts in New York from where she received her MFA. Han lives and works in New York City. Her work was exhibited at Elizabeth Foundation for the Arts, Shenandoah Museum of Contemporary Art, Times Square Arts Center, Contemporary Artists Center, Artifact gallery, Brooklyn Art Cluster and Amos Eno gallery. She has also exhibited her work at the Shenandoah Museum of Contemporary Art.

References

External links

1984 births
Living people
21st-century women artists
Kyung Hee University alumni
School of Visual Arts alumni
South Korean artists
South Korean expatriates in the United States